Force v. Facebook, Inc., 934 F.3d 53 (2nd Cir. 2019) was a 2019 decision by the US Second Circuit Appeals Court holding that Section 230 bars civil terrorism claims against social media companies and internet service providers, the first federal appellate court to do so.

The court ruled that the recommender system remains as part of the role of the distributor of the content and not the publisher, since these automated tools were essentially neutral.  The US Supreme Court declined in 2020 to hear an appeal of the case.

Judge Robert Katzman gave a 35-page dissenting opinion in the Force case, stating “Mounting evidence suggests that providers designed their algorithms to drive users toward content and people the users agreed with — and that they have done it too well, nudging susceptible souls ever further down dark paths."  Katzman's dissent was cited by Judge Clarence Thomas statement in respect of denying certiorari to Malwarebytes, Inc. v. Enigma Software Group USA, LLC.

The Electronic Frontier Foundation filed an amicus curaie brief in the case, arguing for platform immunity.

The court that year also declined to hear Dyroff v. Ultimate Software Group Inc., a related case that cited Force.

Case History
Oral arguments

Subsequent Case Law and Commentary

See also 
 Lawsuits involving Meta Platforms

References 

United States lawsuits